{{DISPLAYTITLE:C14H16ClNO}}
The molecular formula C14H16ClNO (molar mass: 249.73594 g/mol, exact mass: 249.0920 u) may refer to:

 Bexlosteride
 Sercloremine (CGP-4718A)

Molecular formulas